David Ellsworth Harris (born December 22, 1934) is the first African American commercial airline pilot and first to achieve the rank of Pilot Captain for a major U.S. commercial airline.

Early life, education, personal life
Harris was born on December 22, 1934, in Columbus, Ohio. His father was Wilbur Rothchild Harris Sr. (June 4, 1900 – July 31, 1989 and his mother was Ruth A. Estis Harris (March 19, 1903 – September 22, 1961), and he had one brother,  Wilbur Rothchild "Wil" Harris Jr. (November 1, 1932 – January 7, 2020) who served as a U.S. Army Honor Guard at Arlington National Cemetery Tomb of the Unknown Soldier. His early life saw him grow up in  an integrated neighborhood in Columbus, where he attended University School, a private high school. Harris's grandfather was Reverend Henry Estis (January 5, 1863 – May 20, 1948, a formerly enslaved African American from Lunenburg County, Virginia and founder and pastor of Chillicothe, Ohio's Zion Baptist Church.

IN 1957, Harris graduated from Ohio State University, with a B.S. degree in education. While a University student there, he was rejected twice for Ohio States’ advanced Air Force ROTC program on racial grounds. He was eventually granted admission, and once in the program, rose to the rank of cadet colonel.

Harris then married Lynne Purdy Harris, and relationship created two progeny.

U.S. military career
In 1958, Harris joined the U.S. Air Force (USAF), following the receipt of a Reserve Officers Training Corps commission as a 2nd lieutenant.

Following his completion of basic flight training in Orlando, Florida, Harris graduated from advanced flight training at Big Spring, Texas, flying Boeing B-47 Stratojets there. He was then assigned to a number of bases across the U.S., including New York, Florida Maine, and Texas, He was also assigned to an airbase in England,  where the U.S. Air Force maintained vigilance against the Soviet Union. in the cold war context. Harris piloted B-47 that were armed with nuclear weapons, and the B-52 for the Strategic Air Command (SAC) during this period.

After struggling with race-based housing discrimination during his assignments, Harris left the military on December 1, 1964, to better support his wife and two children. He was discharged with the rank of Captain.

Pioneering commercial airline career
Prior to him entering civilian life, Harris interviewed with several major U.S. commercial airlines for a pilot's job without success, largely denied a position on racial grounds. As a light-complexioned African American who could possibly be misconstrued as Passing (racial identity), Harris closed all of his application letters with the declarative statement: “I'm married, I have two children and I'm black.” In 1964, Harris interviewed with American Airlines. To avoid what Harris deemed to be an inevitable denial based on his race, Harris informed the interviewer that he was African American. The chief pilot conducting the interview responded: “This is American Airlines and we don't care if you're black, white or chartreuse, we only want to know, can you fly the plane?”

On December 3, 1964, two days after leaving the USAF, Harris became the first African American hired as a commercial airline pilot for a major U.S. commercial airline, American Airlines. Following the completion of  nine-week training, Harris became an American Airline co-pilot.

Three years later, in 1967 Harris became the first African American male to achieve the rank of Pilot Captain for a major U.S. commercial airline.

While flying at American Airlines, Harris piloted a number of different types of commercial aircraft including the Boeing 747, Boeing 727, Boeing 767, the Airbus A300, the Douglas DC-6, the Douglas DC-7, the Lockheed Model 10 Electra aircraft, the BAC One-Eleven and the McDonnell Douglas MD-11, American Airlines' largest commercial aircraft during Harris' career.

Harris retired in 1984, after flying for American Airlines for a total of 30 years.

Harris is considered a  pioneer African American commercial airline pilot. A year after Harris was hired by American, Western Airlines hired African American pilot Fred Pitcher; United Airlines hired African American pilot Bill Norwood. Eventually, other major U.S. commercial airlines would hire its inaugural slate of African American pilots including Eastern Airlines’ Les Morris, TWA’s John Gordon,  Delta Airlines’ Sam Grady, Northwest Airlines’ Woodie Fountain, DHL’s Irvory Carter and Pan Am’s M. Perry Jones.

Friendship with Whitney Young
1967 saw Harris meet civil rights leader and National Urban League executive director Whitney Young on one of Harris’ flights in Indianapolis, Indiana Exiting his cockpit, Harris introduced himself to Young, and thanked him for helping African Americans get jobs in various fields including aviation.
 
Young drowned in Lagos, Nigeria four years later, while attending an international conference. Young's wife, Margaret, asked American Airlines to locate the African-American pilot Young met years earlier. Margaret wanted American Airlines the pilot in question to fly her husband's remains back to the United States. When American Airlines offered an all-African-American flight and cabin crew, Margaret balked: "That's not the way of the Urban League. It should be black and white together." Honoring Margaret's wishes, Harris flew Young's body from Lagos, Nigeria, to New York City, New York.

Post-retirement
Harris has resided in Beverly, Massachusetts and in Country Haven, an Airpark/fly-in community near Trenton, South Carolina. He flies a single-engine Socata Trinidad at Country Haven.

Memberships
Harris served as the president of the Organization of Black Airline Pilots (OBAP). He has also retained his membership with the Negro Airmen International (NAI).

Honors
The Smithsonian National Air & Space Museum features Harris and his uniform, hat and other memorabilia in its “Black Wings in Aviation” exhibit.
The American Airlines C.R. Smith Museum in Fort Worth, Texas features Harris in its permanent exhibit.
During a ceremony honoring Harris as the first African American commercial airline pilot, Harris remarked: I'm honored and humbled by this award ... but the reality is that there were 500 pilots Tuskegee Airmen who were qualified for airline jobs when they left the service. None of them received an opportunity to sit in a cockpit. There is no way I should be the first; it should've happened long before 1964."

References 

African-American people
Aviators from Ohio
Commercial aviators
African-American aviators
20th-century African-American people
Living people
1934 births